Seguenzia antarctica is a species of sea snail, a marine gastropod mollusk in the family Seguenziidae.

Description

The height of the shell attains .

Distribution
This species occurs in the Weddell Sea, Antarctica.

References

 Engl W. (2012) Shells of Antarctica. Hackenheim: Conchbooks. 402 pp.

antarctica
Gastropods described in 1925